Monument Mountain is the name of a popular  open space reservation located in Great Barrington, Massachusetts on the southeast side of Monument Mountain. The reservation is centered on the  subordinate summit of Peeskawso Peak. It is managed by The Trustees of Reservations, a non-profit conservation organization and is notable for its expansive views of the Housatonic River Valley, The Berkshires, the Taconic Mountains, and the Catskill Mountains of New York from the knife-edge summit of Peeskawso Peak. Monument Mountain, composed of erosion resistant quartzite, is of The Berkshires geology. The reservation receives more than 20,000 visitors a year.
The mountain was logged for charcoal to fuel a furnace in Vandusenville at the corner of Division St and Rt 41 in Great Barrington , not the for-mentioned furnaces of Falls Village etc 
Remnants of the furnace can be seen if one stands on the Rt41 bridge and looks upstream on the Williams River

History
Monument Mountain was a sacred place to the ancestors of the Mohican people since time immemorial. They left stone prayers in a monument that gives the mountain its name. 

It has been the subject of art and literature since as early as 1815 when the poet William Cullen Bryant penned "Monument Mountain," an account of the story of a Mohican woman who allegedly leapt from what is now called Peeskawso Peak. In 1850, Nathaniel Hawthorne and Herman Melville picnicked on the mountain;a thunderstorm forced them to seek cover in a boulder cave where they engaged in a lengthy discussion that inspired some of Melville's ideas for his novel Moby Dick.

In the 1930s, red pines were planted on the reservation; by that time much of the mountain had been heavily logged for the charcoal industry in support of iron foundries in Falls Village, Connecticut and Lenox, Massachusetts.

The reservation was acquired as the gift of Helen C. Butler in 1899 and John Butler Swann in 1980. Additional parcels were purchased in 1985 and 1986.

In 2021, the Trustees renamed the summit and two trails after collaboration with the Stockbridge-Munsee Community Band of Mohicans.   Indian Monument Trail was renamed the Mohican Monument Trail, Squaw Peak Trail was renamed the Peeskawso Peak Trail, and Squaw Peak, a summit of Monument Mountain, was renamed Peeskawso Peak.

Recreation
A trailhead parking lot is located on Massachusetts Route 7 north of Great Barrington center. Parking is free for Trustees of Reservations members; $5 per car for the general public. The trail system consists of the Hickey Trail and Mohican Monument Trail which form a loop around Peeskawso Peak; and Peeskawso Peak Trail which ascends the knife edge summit between the other two trails. The trail to the summit includes a little bit of rock scrambling and has been the scene of some accidents and falls. An unnamed waterfall is located along the Hickey Trail. Devil's Pulpit, part of Peeskawso Peak, is a free-standing pillar of stone visible from the Peeskawso Peak Trail.

The reservation is open to hiking, picnicking, and hunting (in season).

External links

The Trustees of Reservations
Trail map

References

The Trustees of Reservations
Protected areas of Berkshire County, Massachusetts
Open space reserves of Massachusetts
Great Barrington, Massachusetts
Protected areas established in 1899
1899 establishments in Massachusetts